The Estadio Municipal David Alfonso Ordóñez Bardales is a football stadium located in Zacapa, Guatemala. It is home to club Deportivo Zacapa (Los Gallos). It has a capacity of 8,100 spectators.
The stadium was named on former Mayor of Zacapa, David Ordóñez Bardales. It opened in 1952 and it was formerly known as Estadio Valentín del Cid.

References

David Ordonez Bardales